Cepta Cullen was considered Ireland's "first serious choreographer" and an important figure in the development of Irish Ballet. She was also a performer and teacher. Cullen trained as a dancer in the Abbey School of Ballet under Ninette de Valois in Dublin. Her career spans from about 1928 to 1944 though she continued to teach. Cullen went on to open her own Ballet school after her teacher left Ireland and the Abbey school officially closed in 1933. Cullen's school was The Irish Ballet Club which she founded in 1939 and which was based in the Peacock Theatre, Dublin. The school staged fourteen ballets during the five years of operation.

Possibly the most successful show she choreographed was Puck Fair. The ballet was scripted by the poet F. R. Higgins, designed by Mainie Jellett and composed by Elizabeth Maconchy. The performance opened in the Gaiety Theatre, Dublin in February 1941. It was a typical example of the work of Cullen between 1939 and 1944. The ballets were often based on Irish themes. Cullen had worked with a number of names from the Irish arts scene. She worked with Micheál Mac Liammóir on a ballet which eventually was written as part of a different production.

Very little is known about Cullen apart from her work in ballet and her impact on ballet in Ireland. Cullen married Lieutenant Richard Patrick Gower on 30 July 1948 in Dublin.

References

Date of birth missing
Date of death unknown
Irish choreographers
Irish ballet dancers
Dancers from Dublin (city)